The 2005 Boston mayoral election occurred on Tuesday, November 8, 2005, between incumbent mayor Thomas Menino and City Councilor Maura Hennigan. Menino was re-elected to a fourth term.

As Menino and Hennigan were the only two candidates, no preliminary election was held. 36% of registered voters turned out to vote in the election.

Candidates
Maura Hennigan, Boston City Councilor since 1982
Thomas Menino, Mayor of Boston since 1993

Endorsements

Results

See also
List of mayors of Boston, Massachusetts

References

Mayoral elections in Boston
Boston
Boston mayoral
Mayoral election
Boston mayoral election